Chorus is an album by German double bassist and composer Eberhard Weber featuring Jan Garbarek and Ralf-R. Hübner recorded in 1984 and released on the ECM label.

Track listing
All compositions by Eberhard Weber.

 "Part I" – 7:32   
 "Part II" – 5:31   
 "Part III/IV" – 8:03   
 "Part V" – 3:23   
 "Part VI" – 7:52   
 "Part VII" – 8:05

Personnel
Eberhard Weber – bass, synthesizer
Jan Garbarek – soprano saxophone, tenor saxophone
Ralf-R. Hübner – drums
Manfred Hoffbauer – clarinet, flute
Martin Künstner – oboe, English horn

References

ECM Records albums
Eberhard Weber albums
1985 albums
Albums produced by Manfred Eicher